Elampus cecchiniae is a species of wasp in the cuckoo wasp family (Chrysididae). The species was first described in 1967 by A. P. Semenov-Tian-Shanskij as Notozus cecchiniae and transferred to the genus Elampus in 1991. The holotype is a male that was found in Turkmenistan.

References

Chrysidinae
Hymenoptera of Asia